Idris "Alex" Ughiovhe (born January 27, 1983 in Washington, DC) is an American soccer player of Nigerian heritage who last played for Crystal Palace Baltimore in the USSF Second Division.

Career

Youth and college
Ughiovhe played college soccer at Howard University, and for Richmond Kickers Future in the USL Premier Development League,

Professional
Ughiovhe was drafted in the fourth round 2006 MLS Supplemental Draft by Chicago Fire, played several reserve matches for both Chicago and D.C. United, and was signed to a developmental contract by Fire on September 19, 2006, but was released before he played a game.

He signed for Crystal Palace Baltimore in the USL Second Division prior to the team's inaugural 2007 season, and made his professional debut on April 20, 2007 in Baltimore's season-opening 4–1 loss to the Charlotte Eagles.

Career statistics
(correct as of September 29, 2009)

External links
 Crystal Palace Baltimore bio

References

1983 births
Living people
USL Second Division players
USL League Two players
Crystal Palace Baltimore players
Chicago Fire FC players
Howard Bison men's soccer players
Richmond Kickers Future players
African-American soccer players
Chicago Fire FC draft picks
Soccer players from Washington, D.C.
American soccer players
Association football defenders
21st-century African-American sportspeople
20th-century African-American people